The IBM 1500 instructional system was introduced by IBM on March 31, 1966, and its primary purpose was to implement Computer Assisted Instruction (CAI). Based around either an IBM 1130 or an IBM 1800 computer, it supported up to 32 student work stations, each with a variety of audiovisual capabilities.

Seeded by a research grant in 1964 from the U.S. Department of Education to the Institute for Mathematical Studies in the Social Sciences at Stanford University, the IBM 1500 CAI system was initially prototyped at the Brentwood Elementary School (Ravenswood City School District) in East Palo Alto, California by Dr. Patrick Suppes of Stanford University. The students first used the system in 1966.

The first production IBM 1500 system was shipped to Stanford University in August 1967.

Preliminary versions of course materials that educators could use with the IBM 1500 were developed by Science Research Associates, Inc., an IBM subsidiary.

Most educational programming on the IBM 1500 system was done in the specialized computer programming language called Coursewriter.

The IBM 1500 system and its learning environment was a modern step in the history of virtual learning environments.

Overview 
Buck and Hunka wrote in their 1996 retrospective and historical paper that:

"The IBM 1500 Instructional System was the only commercial system produced by a single manufacturer that had an integrated student terminal configuration providing a keyboard and light pen response mode, CRT-based graphics, audio, and static film projection. Experimental instructional systems had been developed by IBM prior to a prototype version of the 1500 Instructional System, which was tested at Stanford University. A production version of the 1500 System with changes in the CPU and the audio system and having the capability to run a maximum of 32 student stations was installed in over 31 sites beginning in the late 1950s. IBM's commitment to the development of this system was extensive but short-lived, as most sites were unable to maintain funding support for the system. In retrospect, the IBM 1500 System had capabilities yet to be supported on the microcomputer systems of the 1980s."

Selected educational applications 
The Computer Assisted Instruction (CAI) Division of the U.S. Army Signal Center and School (USASCS) at Fort Monmouth, New Jersey evaluated CAI's success in teaching basic electronics by using material presented in the tutorial mode on the IBM 1500 System, utilizing the IBM Coursewriter language, an IBM 1510 Display Console, and an IBM 1512 Image Projector.

References

Further reading 
 "Mobilizing Minds: Teaching Math and Science in the Age of Sputnik: Mathematics Lesson on the IBM 1500 Instructional System, 1966", Smithsonian Institution.
 Dick, Walter; Gallagher, Tom, "Systems Concepts and Computer-Managed Instruction: An Implementation and Validation Study", in Introduction to the Systems Approach, Education Technology Reviews Series, no.3, January 1973, pp. 19–25. Cf. especially p. 21 on the IBM 1500 and Coursewriter.
 Hunka, S., "The Computer-Aided Instruction Activities of the Division of Educational Research Services at the University of Alberta", International Journal of Man-Machine Studies, Volume 5, Issue 3, July 1973, Pages 329-336 
 Lipsitz, Lawrence, (Editor); Reisner, Trudi, The Computer and Education, Englewood Cliffs, NJ : Educational Technology Publications, January 1973. Articles selected from Educational Technology magazine. Cf. pp. 50, 80, 144 & various.
 Terlet, R.H., "The CRT display subsystem of the IBM 1500 instructional system", AFIPS Joint Computer Conferences, Proceedings of the November 14–16, 1967, Fall Joint Computer Conference, Anaheim, California. Session on Display systems and equipment, pp. 169–176.
 "CAI and the IBM 1500 System at DERS (Division of Educational Research Services)", University of Alberta, Canada.

External links 
 A list of IBM 1500 installations in North America
 An informative video of the IBM 1500 system at the University of Alberta

Educational hardware
1500
1500
1500